Saba Purtseladze (born 20 August 2001) is a Georgian tennis player.

Purtseladze has a career high ATP singles ranking of 710 achieved on 9 May 2022. He also has a career high ATP doubles ranking of 919 achieved on 16 May 2022.

Purtseladze made his ATP main draw debut at the 2022 ATP Cup as one of the five members of the Georgian team.

Purtseladze represents Georgia at the Davis Cup, where he has a W/L record of 1–1.

Challenger and World Tennis Tour Finals

Singles: 4 (3–1)

References

External links

2001 births
Living people
Male tennis players from Georgia (country)
Sportspeople from Tbilisi